Salvador Arango is a Colombian sculptor, born in Itagüi, Colombia in 1944. He is known as "SAAR".

Career 

In 1976, Arango attended the Ninth International Sculpture Conference in New Orleans on behalf of Colombia, and was invited by the University of Pennsylvania.

Recognition 
In 1978, documentary films of Bogotá performed "Bootstrap," a 15-minute film on his life and work. The film was screened across the country, led by Leopoldo Pinzon. 

In 1990 he was invited by International Art Connection to represent Colombia in a major exhibition of visual arts International Des Createurs Laura La Chapelle de la Sorbonne in Paris.

Works 
The Beetle
A New Beginning
The Thinker
The Lady of the Harp
The Lady of Justice
The Lady of the Mirror

See also
Museum of Antioquia
Medellín
Colombia

References

1944 births
Living people
People from Itagüí
Colombian sculptors